Anne Sakdinawat is a physicist and a staff scientist at SLAC National Accelerator Laboratory, where her work focuses on the development on novel manufacturing techniques for nanoscale X-ray imaging. She is the co-author of a book on 
soft X-rays and extreme ultraviolet radiation.

Education and career  
Sakdinawat worked as a research scientist in the Electrical Engineering and Computer Sciences Department at the University of California, Berkeley. Then, she received her PhD in bioengineering in 2008 from the University of California, Berkeley, where she worked under the supervision of David Attwood. She joined SLAC National Accelerator Laboratory in 2012 and formed the NanoX group for x-ray optics. The research focuses on the brightest X-ray sources to develop techniques and imaging tools.

Awards and honor 
 2015 DOE Early Career Research Program
 2008 Werner Meyer-Ilse Memorial Award

References 

Living people
University of California, Berkeley alumni
American physicists
Optical physicists
American women scientists
American women physicists
Year of birth missing (living people)
21st-century American women